Grace Methodist Church Complex, also known as Grace United Methodist Church, is a historic Methodist church complex located at Speculator, Hamilton County, New York. The church was built in 1909 and is a compact Gothic Revival style frame church.  It has an engaged bell tower and a concrete block Sunday School wing added in 1957.  The front facade features three symmetrically placed Gothic-arched windows.  The parsonage was built in 1928, and is a two-story wood-frame building with a gambrel roof and dormers in the Dutch Colonial Revival style.

It was added to the National Register of Historic Places in 2015.

References

External links
church website

United Methodist churches in New York (state)
Churches on the National Register of Historic Places in New York (state)
Gothic Revival church buildings in New York (state)
Churches completed in 1909
Churches in Hamilton County, New York
National Register of Historic Places in Hamilton County, New York